Poplar Island is a small island of Canada located off the west coast of Charlottetown, Prince Edward Island. It is within Charlottetown city limits, in the North River of Charlottetown Harbour, less than a quarter mile east of the town of Cornwall.  It is connected to both sides of the river via Causeways, over which Prince Edward Island Route 1 runs.

References

Islands of Prince Edward Island